Extensor hallucis muscle may refer to:

 Extensor hallucis brevis muscle
 Extensor hallucis longus muscle